Khebisa Gewog is a gewog (village block) of Dagana District, Bhutan.

References 

Gewogs of Bhutan
Dagana District